Boneh-ye Meskin (also Romanized as Boneh-ye Meskīn) is a village in Sorkheh Rural District, Fath Olmobin District, Shush County, Khuzestan Province, Iran. At the 2006 census, its population was 102, in 13 families.

References 

Populated places in Shush County